Sandro Ricardo Rodrigues Viana (born March 26, 1977 in Manaus) is a track and field sprint athlete who competes internationally for Brazil.

Viana represented Brazil at the 2008 Summer Olympics in Beijing. He competed at the 100 metres sprint and placed 6th in his heat without advancing to the second round. He ran the distance in a time of 10.60 seconds. Together with José Carlos Moreira, Vicente de Lima and Bruno de Barros he also competed at the 4x100 metres relay. In their qualification heat they placed fourth behind Trinidad and Tobago, Japan and the Netherlands. Their time of 39.01 was the seventh out of sixteen participating nations in the first round and they qualified for the final. There they sprinted to a time of 38.24 seconds, the fourth time after the Jamaican, Trinidad and Japanese teams. He also took part in the 200 metres individual, finishing fourth in his first round heat, with a time of 20.84 seconds. With 21.07 seconds in the second round he only placed seventh in his heat, which was not enough to qualify for the semi finals.

At the 2012 Summer Olympics, he again competed in the 200 metres and the men's 4 × 100 m relay.  He did not reach beyond the heats in the 200 m and the Brazilian men's 4 × 100 m team missed out on the final by 0.06 of a second.

Viana would retroactively be awarded the bronze medal for the 4 × 100 metres relay at the 2008 Summer Olympics following the demotion in 2017 of the Jamaican team for Nesta Carter's failed anti-doping test.

Competition record

References

1977 births
Living people
Brazilian male sprinters
Olympic athletes of Brazil
Athletes (track and field) at the 2007 Pan American Games
Athletes (track and field) at the 2008 Summer Olympics
Athletes (track and field) at the 2011 Pan American Games
Athletes (track and field) at the 2012 Summer Olympics
People from Manaus
Pan American Games gold medalists for Brazil
Pan American Games medalists in athletics (track and field)
Universiade medalists in athletics (track and field)
Universiade bronze medalists for Brazil
Medalists at the 2005 Summer Universiade
Medalists at the 2007 Pan American Games
Medalists at the 2011 Pan American Games
Sportspeople from Amazonas (Brazilian state)
20th-century Brazilian people
21st-century Brazilian people